Designator code may refer to:

IATA airline designator
ICAO airline designator